The Women's 200 metre freestyle swimming events for the 2020 Summer Paralympics took place at the Tokyo Aquatics Centre from August 25 to August 27, 2021. A total of 2 events were contested over this distance.

Schedule

Medal summary
The following is a summary of the medals awarded across all 200 metre freestyle events.

Results
The following were the results of the finals only of each of the Women's 200 metre freestyle events in each of the classifications. Further details of each event, including where appropriate heats and semi finals results, are available on that event's dedicated page.

S5

The S5 category is for swimmers who have hemiplegia, paraplegia, or short stature.

The final in this classification took place on 25 August 2021:

S14

The S14 category is for swimmers who have an intellectual impairment.

The final in this classification will take place on 27 August 2021:

References

Swimming at the 2020 Summer Paralympics
2021 in women's swimming